Regina Schöpf (later Bacher; 16 September 1935 – 30 October 2008) was an Austrian alpine skier who competed in the 1956 Winter Olympics.

She was born in Seefeld, Tirol.

In 1956 she won the silver medal in the slalom event. In the giant slalom competition she finished ninth.

External links
 profile

1935 births
2008 deaths
Austrian female alpine skiers
Olympic alpine skiers of Austria

Alpine skiers at the 1956 Winter Olympics
Olympic silver medalists for Austria
Olympic medalists in alpine skiing
Medalists at the 1956 Winter Olympics
20th-century Austrian women